Vulcan's Glory is a Star Trek: The Original Series novel written by D.C. Fontana. Fontana was a writer and producer on the original Star Trek television series, and throughout her career was responsible for writing much of the backstory surrounding Spock's Vulcan heritage. This was her only Star Trek novel.

The story focuses on the crew of the Enterprise while Captain Christopher Pike was in command from the period featured in the pilot episode "The Cage". A younger Montgomery Scott also appears.

Plot

Young ensign Spock, is serving his first mission on the Starship Enterprise under Captain Christopher Pike. Spock is having a difficult time dealing with his Vulcan heritage and how it conflicts with his duties as an officer and what he wants personally.

Spock becomes involved in a mission to retrieve the 'Vulcan's Glory', a priceless gem thought lost in a spaceship crash. It is soon discovered there is far more to this mission than is readily apparent.

Background
Pocket Books editor Dave Stern approached Fontana to write a Star Trek novel, and she proposed writing the story of Spock's first mission on the Enterprise, joining a crew led by Captain Christopher Pike. She described this as a pleasant experience, particularly working with Stern.

References

External links

 Review of Vulcan's Glory by them0vieblog.com

Novels by D. C. Fontana
Novels based on Star Trek: The Original Series
1989 American novels
American science fiction novels